Schefflera polybotrya is a species of shrub in the family Araliaceae. They are climbers.

Sources

References 

polybotrya